Gorokhovo is a rural locality (a village) in Butylitskoye Rural Settlement, Melenkovsky District, Vladimir Oblast, Russia. The population was 39 as of 2010.

Geography 
Gorokhovo is located 34 km north of Melenki (the district's administrative centre) by road. Skripino is the nearest rural locality.

References 

Rural localities in Melenkovsky District